Aliou Badji (born 10 October 1997) is a Senegalese professional footballer who plays as a forward for French club Bordeaux on loan from Ligue 1 side Amiens.

Club career
Casa Sports was Badji's first club. On 31 January 2017, he completed a transfer to Sweden to join Allsvenskan side Djurgårdens IF, signing a four-year contract. His professional debut for the club came on 3 April in a league game against IK Sirius. Badji scored his first professional goal on 23 July in the league versus Östersunds FK. In the next game, Badji started for the first time and scored after 30 minutes against AFC Eskilstuna. While having difficulties establishing himself as a starter in his first seasons at Djurgårdens IF, Badji earned a reputation as a late-in-the-game goal scorer, with key goals scored late against Häcken, Mariupol and AIK.

In January 2019, it was revealed Badji had rejected a move to Hebei China Fortune of the Chinese Super League. On 6 February, Badji was transferred to Rapid Wien for an undisclosed fee; signing a three-a-half-year contract. On 16 January 2020, Egyptian Premier League side Al Ahly announced the signing of Badji on a four-a-half-year contract for a reported fee of €2 million. He netted on his league debut for the club, scoring the equaliser in an eventual 2–1 win away to Pyramids on 6 February. In August 2021, Badji joined French club Amiens on a one-year loan with an option to buy.

International career
Badji has represented Senegal at U20 level, he scored 12 goals in 12 caps prior to participating in the 2017 Africa U-20 Cup of Nations in Zambia; he scored one goal (in the semi-final versus Guinea U20) as Senegal went onto finish as runners-up. He also appeared for Senegal at the 2017 FIFA U-20 World Cup in South Korea.

Career statistics
.

Honours
Djurgårdens IF
 Svenska Cupen: 2017–18
Al Ahly
 CAF Champions League: 2019–20
 Egypt Cup: 2019–20
 Egyptian Premier League: 2019-20

References

External links
 

1997 births
Living people
Place of birth missing (living people)
Senegalese footballers
Senegal youth international footballers
Association football forwards
Senegalese expatriate footballers
Expatriate footballers in Sweden
Expatriate footballers in Austria
Expatriate footballers in Egypt
Expatriate footballers in Turkey
Expatriate footballers in France
Senegalese expatriate sportspeople in Sweden
Senegalese expatriate sportspeople in Austria
Senegalese expatriate sportspeople in Egypt
Senegalese expatriate sportspeople in Turkey
Senegalese expatriate sportspeople in France
Senegal Premier League players
Allsvenskan players
Austrian Football Bundesliga players
Egyptian Premier League players
Ligue 2 players
Casa Sports players
Djurgårdens IF Fotboll players
SK Rapid Wien players
Al Ahly SC players
Amiens SC players
MKE Ankaragücü footballers
FC Girondins de Bordeaux players